A xerocole, is a general term referring to any animal that is adapted to live in a desert. The main challenges xerocoles must overcome are lack of water and excessive heat. To conserve water they avoid evaporation and concentrate excretions (i.e. urine and feces). Some are so adept at conserving water or obtaining it from food that they do not need to drink at all. To escape the desert heat, xerocoles tend to be either nocturnal or crepuscular (most active at dawn and dusk).

Water conservation

Avoiding evaporation
Xerocoles have developed a variety of mechanisms to reduce water loss via evaporation. Mammalian xerocoles sweat much less than their non-desert counterparts. For example, the camel can survive ambient temperatures as high as  without sweating, and the kangaroo rat lacks sweat glands entirely. Both birds and mammals in the desert have oils on the surface of their skin to "waterproof" it and inhibit evaporation.

Desert insects use a similar method, as their cuticles are waxy to prevent water from escaping; however, at critical temperatures (ex.  for cockroaches), the wax molecules in the cuticle rearrange to become permeable and permit evaporative cooling.

Amphibious xerocoles, such as species of the frog genus Phyllomedusa, have wax-like coatings on their skin to reduce water loss. The frogs secrete lipids from glands in their skin: when their skin begins to dry out, they move their limbs over the glands on their backs, and wipe the lipids over their bodies. Other desert amphibians, such as the frog genus Cyclorana, avoid desiccation by burrowing underground during dry periods and forming a cocoon from shed skin: rather than being sloughed off, the skin remains attached to create the cocoon. As skin layers amass, water impermeability increases.

During evaporation

Though desert birds lack sweat glands, they can still take advantage of evaporative cooling by panting, which cools the trachea and lungs, and gular flapping, which consists of rapidly fluttering the gular skin to move air over the inner mouth and throat. Kangaroo rats and other small mammals use evaporative cooling in a similar way. The low temperature causes moisture to condense, partially making up for the water that was lost. The process, called respiratory heat exchange, works best when the walls of the nasal passage have a large surface area.

Some animals pour bodily fluids on themselves to take advantage of evaporative cooling. Xerocole birds such as storks, New World vultures, and ibis urinate on their legs, while desert tortoises sometimes salivate on their neck and front legs to keep cool. Similarly, many rodents and marsupials lick themselves to spread saliva, though this only remains effective for a short time, and requires the fur to become very damp.

Excretion

Urine

To excrete nitrogenous waste products, mammals (and most amphibians) excrete urea diluted in water. Such xerocoles have adapted to make their urine as concentrated as possible (i.e. use the least amount of water) to dissolve urea. Desert mammals have longer and more deeply inset nephrons, as well as smaller and fewer cortical and juxtamedullary glomeruli (glomeruli being capillary networks where both fluid and waste are extracted from blood). This in turn leads to a smaller glomerular filtration rate, and on the whole, less water is transferred from the blood to the kidney. The kidneys of desert mammals are also better adapted at reabsorbing water from the tubular fluid: though there are fewer glomeruli, the xerocole has larger juxtamedullary glomeruli than cortical glomeruli (the former playing an important role in concentrating urine), whereas the opposite is true for non-xerocoles. Desert mammals also have longer loops of Henle, structures whose efficiency in concentrating urine is directly proportional to their length. The efficiency of their loops of Henle is augmented by the increased antidiuretic hormone in their blood.

Desert amphibians can store more nitrogen than aquatic ones, and do so when not enough water is available to excrete the nitrogen as urea. The African reed frog can store excess nitrogen in iridophore, pigmented granules in its skin, by converting the nitrogen to guanine, which makes up the majority of the iridophores' composition.

Reptiles, birds, insects, and some amphibious species excrete nitrogenous waste as uric acid rather than urea. Because uric acid is less toxic than urea, it does not need to be dissolved in water to be excreted (as such, it is largely insoluble).

Feces
Most animal feces are over 75% water; xerocoles, however, reabsorb water in the gut and produce much drier feces. For example, the kangaroo rat's feces contain only  as much water as that of other, non-desert rodents. In insects, the rectal gland also absorbs water, and the insects excrete dry pellets. In birds, along with some other vertebrates, the ureter and rectum both lead to the cloaca, whose walls also absorb water.

Other methods

Camels can further conserve water by closing an orifice in their stomach to create two compartments: one for water and one for food.

Seed-eating rodents maintain a low metabolic rate to reduce water lost to respiration (and to prevent their burrow from overheating). Rodent mothers produce concentrated milk for their young, and then eat their young's dilute urine and feces to regain some of the water that was lost. Desert canids and kangaroos eat their own young's excrement for the same reason.

The Australian water-holding frog conserves water by retaining urine in the bladder, swelling up like a balloon; it then uses its bladder as a water reserve during the dry season.

Alternative water sources

Xerocoles get a substantial amount of hygroscopic water from their food. Many feed on moisture-filled plants: the aardvark obtains water from wild cucumbers (Cucumis humifructus) and the camel eats succulents and bushes in the winter, getting enough water to go two months without drinking. The oryx eats Acacia leaves late at night, when water content is highest: in the hot, arid daytime the leaves are only 1% water; but in cooler, more humid night the leaves are 40% water. Some xerocoles are able to obtain water from halophytic (saltwater) plants, as they can metabolize high amounts of oxalic acid and produce very concentrated urine. The chisel-toothed kangaroo rat also mitigates the saltiness of the halophyte it eats (the shadscale) by using its broad, sharp lower incisors to scrape off the leaves' salty outerlayer to reach the less-salty center.

Carnivores derive water from their prey's meat and blood. Insectivores, such as the aardwolf (a type of hyena) and the southern grasshopper mouse, are thus largely independent from free water.

Xerocoles obtain a large percentage of their water from the metabolic processes used to break down their food. The water gained from fat is nearly twice the amount gained from carbohydrates, as the former contains more hydrogen (which determines the amount of water produced). The water gained from metabolism is more than enough to offset the water lost from evaporation in the lungs (which increases due to the need for oxygen to break down food).

Thermal regulation

Morphology

Xerocoles such as the hare have large ears that help them keep cool: when the ears stand up, blood flow increases to the numerous vessels there and heat is dissipated.

Desert animals have less fat than their non-desert counterparts, as fat would act as insulation, so retaining heat. What fat they do have is localized, such as in the camel's hump or the bison's neck. In terms of fur, however, desert animals have thick insulating coats that impede the conduction of heat towards the body. The coats are not uniformly distributed, but rather leave sparsely covered patches called "thermal windows" at the axilla, groin, scrotum, and mammary glands. Heat can be dissipated from thermal windows via convection and conduction.

Similarly, desert birds have fewer feathers on the underwing and flank – heat stress induces some birds to raise their wings, increasing the surface area of exposed skin. Birds adjust their feathers to create or dissipate an insulating layer, as typified by the ostrich. At high temperatures, the ostrich elevates its long dorsal feathers to create a barrier against solar radiation while allowing air to move across the skin's surface. In the cool nights, the feathers lower and interlock, trapping an insulating layer above the skin.

Burrows
Most small xerocoles live in burrows to avoid the desert heat. Some animals seal their burrows to keep them moist.

Ectotherms also use burrows as a means to keep warm in the cold desert nights. As ectotherms are usually small and unable to store their own body heat, they quickly take on the external temperature of the environment, which necessitates controlled microenvironments. For example, while reptiles are able to operate at temperatures exceeding optima, they become sluggish when cold. As such, they spend their nights in burrows or crevices, where they create warm environments by quickly generating metabolic heat. Desert lizards usually use other animals' burrows to meet their purposes.

Circadian rhythms
All desert rodents except ground squirrels and chipmunks are nocturnal. Amphibians are usually nocturnal as well, while many other xerocoles are diurnal, but reduce activity at midday and increase in the mornings and evenings. Some xerocoles change their activity patterns depending on the season: nocturnal ants, for example, become diurnal during colder periods.

Many xerocoles, especially rodents, estivate in the summer, becoming more dormant. Some desert amphibians estivate underground for over a year at a time. Unlike hibernation, which leads to a state of torpor, estivation induces lethargy, and can go unnoticed in some animals if their body temperature is not measured.

Protection from the sun

Xerocoles are usually light and sandy in color as a means to reflect solar radiation and reduce heat absorption. Some change color with the seasons to reflect more sunlight in the summer: addaxes change from gray-brown to nearly white. Iguanid lizards can change color on a much smaller time scale by varying melanin concentration. They become darker when burrowing and lighter when basking – both the desert iguana and the zebra-tailed lizard become so pale that they appear to shine due to the amount of light they reflect.

Most desert lizards also have a black peritoneal lining in their abdominal cavity to absorb UV radiation and prevent it from damaging internal organs.

Shade under shrubbery provides resting spots for diurnal lizards, nesting sites for birds, as well as temporary oases for diurnal rodents, who skirt among shady spots. Large animals such as camels and carnivores also spend the hottest parts of the day under shade.

Protection from sand
Desert animals such as the camel, addax, and kangaroo rat have large feet to prevent them from sinking in the sand. The fennec fox has extra fur on the soles of its feet to give it traction and protect it from the hot sand. Most animals in arid environments are slender with long legs, giving them the speed as they travel long distances for food and water.

The three main vulnerabilities against the sand are through the eyes, ears, and nose. To keep sand out of their eyes, xerocoles including reptiles and birds, and some amphibians and mammals have a nictitating membrane in their eyes: a third, transparent eyelid that protects the cornea from blowing sand and can dislodge it from the eye. Reptiles also have eyes the size of pinholes or protected by valves. To keep sand out of their ears, mammals such as the camel and the sand cat have long hairs protruding from them. The camel and the saiga antelope also have adaptations to protect their noses from sand: the former has narrow nostrils it can close, and the latter has a large nose with its nostrils set wide apart and far back to prevent sand from entering when grazing. Reptile diggers have nostrils that face upwards instead of forwards for the same reason.

Speed
Xerocoles, having to travel long distances for food and water, are often adapted for speed, and have long limbs, feet that prevent them from sinking in the sand, and are overall slender in form. As there is little cover to protect them from predators, desert animals also use speed as a defense mechanism. For example, a desert jackrabbit can run much faster than a coyote; as such, "an ordinary wolf or coyote will not attempt to chase him, for they realize the hopelessness of it."

Known xerocoles

The following animals are known xerocoles:

 Aardvark
 Aardwolf
 Acanthodactylus
 Addax
 African leopard
 African lion
 African savanna hare
 African wild ass
 African wild dog
 American badger
 Antelope jackrabbit
 Ankole-Watusi
 Arabian leopard
 Arabian gazelle
 Arabian oryx
 Arabian red fox
 Arabian sand gazelle
 Arabian wildcat
 Arabian wolf
 Arizona bark scorpion
 Arizona black rattlesnake
 Arizona woodpecker
 Armadillo girdled lizard
 Bactrian camel
 Barbary sheep
 Bearded dragon
 Big brown bat
 Big free-tailed bat
 Black-tailed jackrabbit
 Blanford's fox
 Bobcat
 Bolson tortoise
 Burro
 Cactus wren
 Cactus mouse
 Cairo spiny mouse
 California leaf-nosed bat
 California myotis
 California quail
 Cape ground squirrel
 Cape hare
 Caracal
 Cave myotis
 Cerastes
 Chipmunk
 Chuckwalla
 Colorado River toad
 Coues' deer
 Collared peccary
 Common desert centipede
 Common genet
 Coyote
 Cunningham's spiny-tailed skink
 Cuvier's gazelle
 Desert bighorn sheep
 Desert box turtle
 Desert cottontail
 Desert elephant
 Desert hedgehog
 Desert horned lizard
 Desert iguana
 Desert kangaroo rat
 Desert kingsnake
 Desert long-eared bat
 Desert monitor
 Desert mule deer
 Desert pipistrelle
 Desert pocket gopher
 Desert tortoise
 Dorcas gazelle
 Dromedary
 Egyptian mongoose
 Elegant quail
 Fat-tailed gerbil
 Fennec fox
 Ferruginous pygmy owl
 Gemsbok
 Gambel's quail
 Ghost-faced bat
 Giant desert centipede
 Gila monster
 Gila woodpecker
 Grasshopper mouse
 Goanna
 Golden jackal
 Gopher tortoise
 Greater long-nosed bat
 Greater mouse-tailed bat
 Greater roadrunner
 Hamadryas baboon
 Hartebeest
 Honey badger
 Hyperolius
 Kangaroo rat
 Kit fox
 Lappet-faced vulture
 Lesser long-nosed bat
 Lesser mouse-tailed bat
 Lesser roadrunner
 Libyan jird
 Mauritanian shrew
 Meerkat
 Mexican free-tailed bat
 Mexican long-tongued bat
 Mexican wolf
 Mojave rattlesnake
 Nine-banded armadillo
 North African gerbil
 Northwest African cheetah
 Nubian ibex
 Onager
 Ostrich
 Pallid bat
 Pocketed free-tailed bat
 Pygmy gerbil
 Red kangaroo
 Rhim gazelle
 Ring-tailed cat
 Round-tailed ground squirrel
 Rueppell's fox
 Saharan shrew
 Saharan silver ant
 Saharan striped polecat
 Saiga antelope
 Sand cat
 Sidewinder rattlesnake
 Scaled quail
 Scimitar oryx
 Silver-haired bat
 Sonoran collared lizard
 Sonoran Desert tortoise
 Sonoran pronghorn
 Southwestern myotis
 Speckled rattlesnake
 Spotted bat
 Spotted hyena
 Striped hyena
 Texas banded gecko
 Texas horned lizard
 Thorny dragon
 Townsend's big-eared bat
 Water-holding frog
 Western black widow
 Western diamondback rattlesnake
 Western mastiff bat
 Western Saharan spiny mouse
 Whitaker's shrew
 White-bellied carpet viper
 Yuma myotis
 Zebra-tailed lizard

See also

 Arid Forest Research Institute (AFRI)
 Chionophile
 Deserts and xeric shrublands
 Xerophile
 Xerophyte

References

Citations

Sources

External links
Desert Wildlife Photo Gallery from National Geographic
Photo Gallery from Flickr

Xerophiles
Animals by adaptation